George Fisher Baker (March 27, 1840 – May 2, 1931) was an American financier and philanthropist. Known as the "Dean of American Banking", he was also known for his taciturnity. Baker made a fortune after the Civil War in railroads and banking, and at his death was estimated to be the third richest man in the United States, after Henry Ford and John D. Rockefeller.

Early life
Baker was born in Troy, New York, to Eveline Stevens Baker and George Ellis Baker, a shoe-store owner who was elected in 1850 on the Whig ticket to the New York State Assembly. At 14, young George entered the S.S. Seward Institute in Florida, New York, where he studied geography, bookkeeping, history, and algebra. At 16, he was hired as a junior clerk in the New York State Banking Department.

Baker did not attend university, but instead enlisted in the 18th Regiment of the Massachusetts Volunteers at the start of the U.S. Civil War, and achieved the ranks of first lieutenant and adjutant.

Career
In 1863, Baker, along with his mentor, John Thompson, and Thompson's sons Frederick Ferris Thompson and Samuel C. Thompson, co-founded the First National Bank of the City of New York. The  first national bank to be chartered in New York City under the National Currency Act of 1863, it became a forerunner of today's Citibank, N.A.

At age 37, Baker became First National's president on September 1, 1877. His 20,000 shares were worth about $20 million ($ today). He retired as president in 1909, and became chairman of the board. He was succeeded in the presidency by Francis L. Hine, the former vice president of the bank.

An avid investor, he held interests in many corporations and was the largest stockholder in the Central Railroad of New Jersey.  In addition, he was a director in 22 corporations, which with their subsidiaries had aggregate resources of $7.27 billion. Owning $5,965,000 (equivalent to around $83,245,000 in 2017 dollars) of U.S. Steel stock in the early 1920s, Baker was also the largest individual owner of U.S. Steel stock, according to a May 4, 1924, Time magazine article.

Media depiction

The April 14, 1924, edition of Time said of Baker:
 Baker was "closely associated with" the late 19th-century and early 20th-century U.S. robber-baron, monopolist and Wall Street banker J.P. Morgan "in his manifold enterprises", according to Richard Boyer and Herbert Morais's 1955 book, Labor's Untold Story. The same book also noted that "Morgan and associates organized super-trusts in steel (U.S. Steel), shipping (International Mercantile Marine), and agricultural machinery (International Harvester);" and it also "had its hands in other fields—the railroads (where ... some 30,000 miles of railway were controlled), anthracite coal (where from two-thirds to three-quarters of the entire shipment was in Morgan hands)." In addition, other Morgan monopolies included electrical machinery (General Electric), communications (AT &T, Western Union), traction companies (IRT in New York, Hudson & Manhattan), and insurance (Equitable Life).

The March 26, 1934, Time magazine article called him

A 1934 article in Newsweek describes him as one of the most imposing figures in banking history. In the November 1994 issue of Worth magazine, James Grant, editor of a financial newsletter, calls Baker a hidebound turn-of-the-century banker who always got his loans repaid. 

Baker was famously silent in public, never commenting on events or giving interviews, until 1922, at age 82, when he gave his first newspaper interview. Thereafter, he spoke occasionally at luncheons and gatherings.

Personal life
In 1869, Baker was married to Florence Tucker Baker, a daughter of Benjamin Franklin Baker and Sophronia J. (nee Whitney) Baker. Together, they were the parents of:

 Evelyn Baker (1870–1936), who married Howard Bligh St. George in 1891.
 Florence Bellows Baker (1876–1936), who married William Goadby Loew.
 George Fisher Baker Jr. (1878–1937), who married Edith Brevoort Kane. Their daughter Elizabeth married John M. Schiff of Kuhn, Loeb & Co. and their son, George F. Baker III married Frances Drexel Munn, a daughter of Mary Astor Paul and member of the Drexel banking family.

He was a member of the Jekyll Island Club (aka The Millionaires Club) on Jekyll Island, Georgia. He was also a member of the New York Yacht Club, having been elected in 1895.

Baker died in New York City on May 2, 1931.

Properties

Baker lived on Madison Avenue in New York City, and maintained a summer property on Jekyll Island near Brunswick, Georgia, and had an estate in Tuxedo Park, New York.

Top Hat LeBaron Pierce-Arrow
In 1929, Baker commissioned the construction of a unique Pierce-Arrow town car for the wedding of his daughter. Built by LeBaron, the car's roof line was 5 inches taller than standard models so Baker could keep his top hat on. Trim lining in the rear compartment is made of 24-carat gold, as are perfume dispensers and an intercom.

Philanthropy

Baker provided much of the initial funding for Harvard Business School with a 1924 grant of $5 million, for which Harvard gave him an honorary doctorate and named the library after him.

In 1922, Baker established a $1 million dollar endowment fund for the Metropolitan Museum of Art. Baker had been a member of the museum board since 1909.

Baker donated $2 million to Cornell University for the construction of the Baker Laboratory of Chemistry, as well as Baker dormitories, and he endowed the Baker Lecture Series, the oldest continuous lectureship in chemistry in the United States.

He made other large donations to charitable causes throughout New York City and funded the construction of Baker Field, Columbia University's primary athletic facility. He provided $2 million for Baker Memorial Library at Dartmouth College.

References

External links

 
 
 Baker family papers at Baker Library Historical Collections, Harvard Business School
 George F. Baker's 1929 Pierce Arrow Top Hat LaBaron at White Glove Collection
 
  Columbia's Baker Athletic Complex: Donated By Exploiter of Black Convict Labor? Patch.Com
 

1840 births
1931 deaths
Philanthropists from New York (state)
Businesspeople from Troy, New York
American bankers
American financiers
Harvard Business School people
George